Istana Besar or Grand Palace is the royal palace of the Sultan of Johor which is located in Johor Bahru, Malaysia.

Overview
Standing tall in the city of Johor Bahru, the palace was built in 1866 by Sultan Abu Bakar. The palace overlooks the Straits of Johor.

The Grand Palace's most distinctive feature is its Anglo-Malay architecture, characterised by its dome of Malay design contrasted with its blue roof of Anglo influence.

The Grand Palace is currently used only for investitures, state banquets and royal functions.

Royal Museum
The most interesting part of the palace is the Royal Abu Bakar Museum located within the palace which was renovated to become a museum in 1982 and officially opened in 1990. It is a living museum which houses a good collection of royal heirloom, impressive rare artifacts and a good record of the history of the state's royal family. The Royal Museum was closed to the public from January 2012.

See also
Istana Bukit Serene
Istana Pasir Pelangi
Pasir Pelangi

References

Official residences of Malaysian state leaders
Royal residences in Malaysia
Palaces in Johor